Kham Sakaesaeng is a district (amphoe) in the northern part of Nakhon Ratchasima province, northeastern Thailand.

History
The government separated the two tambons Kham Sakaesaeng and Mueang Nat from Non Sung district and created the minor district (king amphoe) Kham Sakaesaeng on 25 November 1968. It was upgraded to a full district on 28 June 1973.

Geography
Neighbouring districts are (from the north clockwise): Khong, Non Sung, Non Thai, and Phra Thong Kham.

Administration
The district is divided into seven sub-districts (tambons). There two townships (thesaban tambons) within the district: Kham Sakae Saeng covers part of tambon Kham Sakae Saeng and Nong Hua Fan covers parts of tambons Nong Hua Fan and Mueang Nat.

References

External links
amphoe.com

Kham Sakaesaeng